Hicklin Hearthstone is a historic home located near Lexington, Lafayette County, Missouri.  It was built about 1838, and is a two-story, central passage plan, Greek Revival style brick I-house. It has a two-story rear ell and features a one bay wide two story pedimented portico.  Also on the property are the contributing six-cell slave quarters, a two-cell slave house, and a brick cellar house.

It was listed on the National Register of Historic Places in 1982.

References

Houses on the National Register of Historic Places in Missouri
Greek Revival houses in Missouri
Houses completed in 1838
Houses in Lafayette County, Missouri
National Register of Historic Places in Lafayette County, Missouri